Aravindakshan Kaimal   was a politician from the Indian state of Kerala.

He represent Kerala State in Rajya Sabha, the Council of States of India parliament during 1967 to 1968. 

He was from Kechery in Trichur district.

References

Rajya Sabha members from Kerala
People from Thrissur district